Air-Conditioned New Territories Route No. 290 and 290A are Hong Kong bus routes operated by Kowloon Motor Bus, plying between Choi Ming Court in Tseung Kwan O and Tsuen Wan West station.

Routeings of the two routes are roughly the same, save for a section within the neighbourhoods of Sau Mau Ping and Sze Shun in Kwun Tong District, New Kowloon, whereas route 290 passes through without any stops, while 290A call at various stops along the way.

History
Residents of the new town of Tseung Kwan O in New Territories East have been fighting for a direct bus connection to Kwai Chung and Tsuen Wan in New Territories West for many years, citing the reason that travelling by MTR between the two places requires a number of transfers in between. It was under such demand that the Transport Department suggested the introduction of such routes, then unnumbered and proposed to operate between Hang Hau (North) and Tsuen Wan (Nina Tower), in the 2013–2014 Bus Route Development Programme. It was put forward that the route would utilize buses spared by cancelling Cross-Harbour Bus Route 692, which suffered heavy losses in terms of profit for both the KMB and New World First Bus.

The Transport Department confirmed in June 2014 that the route would operate via Sau Ming Road in Sau Mau Ping, and tendering exercise would take place at the end of that month. Such decision sparked opposition from the Sai Kung District Council, which believed that resources spared from the district should not be used to cater for the needs of other districts like Kwun Tong.  

The Government thus gave in to the council's demands and offered that the route would be amended to take a more direct routeing via Kwun Tong Bypass, so that it would not serve Sau Mau Ping. 

This in turn resulted in the disapproval of Kwun Tong District Council, which threatened that actions would be taken by residents of the districts if such amendments take place.

In October 2014, the Government announced that two variants would be available for the Tseung Kwan O to Tsuen Wan bus route, one skipping the whole of Sau Mau Ping and Sze Shun and one calling at stops within the two neighbourhoods, with the total journey time of 63 and 80 minutes respectively. 

Tenders were invited from the existing franchised bus operators for the operation rights of the route a month later. Transport Department confirmed in February 2015 that the then-unnumbered route was awarded to Kowloon Motor Bus, and the company started to operate the two variants, numbered 290 and 290A, on 28 March 2015.

Route
Routes 290 and 290A provides service to the following areas:
 Tiu Keng Leng (Choi Ming Court)
 Sheung Tak Estate
 Hang Hau
 Po Lam
 Tsui Lam Estate and Hong Sing Garden
 Po Lam Road (Po Tat Estate)
 Sau Mau Ping and Sze Shun (for route 290A only)
 Choi Wan Estate
 Choi Hung Estate
 Wong Tai Sin
 Kwai Fong
 Kwai Hing
 Tai Wo Hau
 Tsuen Wan Town Centre
 Tsuen Wan (Nina Tower)

The routings of 290 and 290A differ in Sau Mau Ping and Sze Shun. Between Po Tat Estate and Choi Wan Estate, route 290 adopts a direct routing via Sau Mau Ping Road and Shun Lee Tsuen Road, bypassing and not making any stop at the two public housing estates; route 290A enters and makes stops at both Sau Mau Ping and the Sze Shun area, operating via Sau Ming Road, Shun On Road and Lee On Road.

Apart from the above-mentioned section, the routings of the aforementioned routes, as well as their arrangement in stops, are identical to each other.

Bus Interchange
Like other routes operated by KMB, this route offers a set of  bus-bus interchange fare reductions. These fare reductions are applicable for passengers changing from 290 or 290A to other bus routes in Choi Hung, Choi Wan, Wong Tai Sin and Tsuen Wan. This interchange scheme is also applicable to interchanging with routes operated by Long Win Bus in the Tsuen Wan and Kwai Chung section, as well as NR331 and NR331S, which are non-franchised bus routes providing transportation to Park Island, of which both are operated by Sun Bus.

Vehicles
This route uses 36 buses.

Previous route 290 in Hong Kong
Prior to the introduction of the current route 290, the same number has been applied to a Rennie's Mill – Choi Hung route operated during between 1989 and 1996. Rennie's Mill is the name of Tiu Keng Leng before the area was incorporated into the Tseung Kwan O New Town.

Coincidentally, the routeings of the 1989–1996 and 2015- versions of 290 are the same between Ma Yau Tong Village and Choi Hung station.

See also
 List of bus routes in Hong Kong

References

External links
 Route 290 information on KMB official website
 Route 290A information on KMB official website

Kowloon Motor Bus routes